Sourp Boghos (Saint Paul) is an Armenian Apostolic chapel in Nicosia, Cyprus.

The chapel is located in the old Armenian cemetery near the Ledra Palace hotel, very near the town centre of Nicosia and was built in 1892 by the will and testament of Boghos Odadjian, a translator for the British administration of Cyprus,.

The cemetery was used as a burial place until 1931, when it became full and another Armenian cemetery started its operation to the west of Ayios Dhometios. However, until the 1963-1964 intercommunal troubles it was used a few times a year to celebrate liturgies. Since then, due to the proximity with the cease-fire line, it had been neglected until it was partially restored in 1988 with the initiative of Archimandrite Yeghishe Mandjikian. Between 2008 and 2009, the cemetery and its chapel was restored thanks to the initiative and efforts of Armenian MP Vartkes Mahdessian. The first liturgy since 1963 and the re-consecration of the chapel took place on 11 April 2010, celebrated by Archbishop Varoujan Hergelian.

In March 2010, a commemorative plaque was installed in the cemetery, containing the names of 419 persons buried there.

References

Armenian diaspora in Cyprus
Armenian churches in Cyprus
Churches in Nicosia
Chapels in Cyprus